The list of characters in Epic of Gilgamesh includes humans, demigods, giants, and gods who comprise an epic poem.

References

 
Lists of fictional characters